Bayan-Uul (Rich mountain) is a sum (district) of Dornod Province in eastern Mongolia. Ereen settlement is 26 km NW from Bayan-Uul sum center. In 2009, its population was 4,451.

References 

Districts of Dornod Province